The Kramers–Heisenberg dispersion formula is an expression for the cross section for scattering of a photon by an atomic electron. It was derived before the advent of quantum mechanics by Hendrik Kramers and Werner Heisenberg in 1925, based on the correspondence principle applied to the classical dispersion formula for light. The quantum mechanical derivation was given by Paul Dirac in 1927.

The Kramers–Heisenberg formula was an important achievement when it was published, explaining the notion of "negative absorption" (stimulated emission), the Thomas–Reiche–Kuhn sum rule, and inelastic scattering — where the energy of the scattered photon may be larger or smaller than that of the incident photon — thereby anticipating the discovery of the Raman effect.

Equation 
The Kramers–Heisenberg (KH) formula for second order processes is

It represents the probability of the emission of photons of energy  in the
solid angle  (centered in the  direction), after the excitation of the system with photons of energy .  are the initial, intermediate
and final states of the system with energy  respectively; the delta
function ensures the energy conservation during the whole process.  is the relevant
transition operator.  is the intrinsic linewidth of the intermediate state.

References 

Scattering, absorption and radiative transfer (optics)
Werner Heisenberg